Synaphea xela is a shrub endemic to Western Australia.

It is found along the west coast on undulating sites in the Wheatbelt region of Western Australia between Carnamah and Dandaragan where it grows in sandy-clay-loamy soils over laterite.

References

Eudicots of Western Australia
xela
Endemic flora of Western Australia
Plants described in 2006